The Chand Minar or the Tower of the Moon is a medieval tower in Daulatabad, India. The tower is located in the state of Maharashtra near the Daulatabad-Deogiri fort complex. It was erected in 1445 C.E by King Ala-ud-din Bahmani to commemorate his capture of the fort. Chand Minar bears resemblance to the Qutb Minar of Delhi and was inspired from it.

The Chand Minar is considered to be among the finest specimens of Indo-Islamic architecture in Southern India. It is 63 metres high and is divided into 4 storeys and 24 chambers. A small mosque or praying hall sits at the base of the tower, which is covered with Persian blue tiles. The Tower also displays some indigenous Indian architectural features such as the brackets supporting its balconies The tower's height makes it visible from every corner of the Daulatabad Fort.

Gallery

References

Further reading
 

Minarets in India
Aurangabad district, Maharashtra